The buff-throated saltator (Saltator maximus) is a seed-eating bird in the tanager family Thraupidae. It breeds from southeastern Mexico to western Ecuador and northeastern Brazil.

The adult has a slate-grey head with a white supercilium and a greenish crown. The upperparts are olive green, the underparts are grey becoming buff on the lower belly, and the throat is buff, edged with black. The thick convex bill and legs are black. Young birds are duller, and have a white-mottled blackish throat and breast, and brown markings on the lower underparts.

The common call is a high . Males duet melodiously with a warbled cheery cheery answered by cheery to you.

This is a species of dense vegetation. The buff-throated saltator feeds on fruit (e.g. of Cymbopetalum mayanum (Annonaceae), Trophis racemosa (Moraceae), and gumbo-limbo (Bursera simaruba)), buds, nectar and slow-moving insects. It forages at low and mid levels, sometimes with mixed species flocks.

References

Further reading

External links

 
 
 
 

Saltator
Birds of South America
Birds of the Amazon Basin
Birds of the Guianas
Birds of the Cerrado
Birds of Central America
Birds of the Yucatán Peninsula
Birds of Mexico
Birds of Brazil
Birds described in 1776
Taxa named by Philipp Ludwig Statius Müller